Tracks from the Wilderness is an EP by British folk metal band Skyclad. It contains two new tracks, three live tracks and a cover of "Emerald" by Thin Lizzy. The live tracks were recorded at the Dynamo Festival in Eindhoven during June 1992.

Track listing
"Emerald"  – 3:35
"A Room Next Door"  – 4:52
"When All Else Fails"  – 4:20
"The Declaration of Indifference" (Live)  – 3:59
"Spinning Jenny" (Live)  – 3:02
"Skyclad" (Live)  – 5:26

1992 debut EPs
Skyclad (band) albums
Albums produced by Kevin Ridley